Captain William Hobson (26 September 1792 – 10 September 1842) was an Irish Royal Navy officer who served as the first Governor of New Zealand. He was a co-author of the Treaty of Waitangi.

Hobson was dispatched from London in July 1839, with instructions to take the constitutional steps needed to establish a British colony in New Zealand. He was sworn in as Lieutenant-Governor in Sydney (under George Gipps) and arrived in New Zealand on 29 January 1840.

On 5 February 1840, Hobson met with Māori chiefs at Waitangi, and the following morning they signed a treaty by which the chiefs purportedly voluntarily transferred sovereignty to the British Crown in return for guarantees respecting their lands and possessions and their rights as British subjects. Three months later, Hobson proclaimed British sovereignty over the islands of New Zealand. He also selected the site for a new capital, which he named Auckland.

In May 1841, New Zealand was constituted as a separate Crown colony, with Hobson promoted to Governor and Commander in Chief. In his final months Hobson was dogged by poor health which left him detached from political affairs. He died in office in September 1842.

Early life 
William Hobson was born in Waterford, Ireland, the son of Samuel Hobson, a barrister and Martha Jones. He grew up in an Anglo-Irish Anglican family. He attended a (barely) private school, but despite this disadvantage he joined the Royal Navy on 25 August 1803 as a second-class volunteer. He served in the Napoleonic wars and was later involved in the suppression of piracy in the Caribbean. He became a midshipman in 1806 and some seven years later was a first lieutenant. 

In September 1822 merchants at Nassau equipped two sloops to cruise against pirates, with  proving officers and seamen to man the sloops. One sloop, with 23 men under the command of a midshipman, encountered a pirate schooner and felucca. The British repulsed the schooner and captured the felucca. Those of the felucca's crew who were not killed jumped overboard and were drowned. British casualties amounted to two men killed and seven, including the midshipman, wounded. The second sloop had a worse fortune. The sloop Whim was under the command of Lieutenant William Hobson and two midshipmen from Tyne when on 29 September a pirate schooner captured her at Guanaha. The pirates held the British captive for several days, treating their prisoners badly, but all the British survived.  

Between March 1823 and May 1824 Hobson commanded the schooner , in which he captured several pirate vessels, earning himself the nickname "Lion Hobson". He was promoted to commander on 18 March 1824 and commanded  between 1826 and 1828.

Australia 
In 1836, he was ordered to Australia, arriving at Hobart on 5 August 1836, and at Sydney 18 days later. On 18 September 1836,  left for Port Phillip District (later Melbourne) conveying Captain William Lonsdale and other officials to the new colony. During the next three months, Hobson and his officers thoroughly surveyed Port Phillip, the northern portion of which, by direction of Governor Sir Richard Bourke, was named Hobsons Bay, after him.

His ship was involved in the founding of Williamstown. He was offered the position of Superintendent of the Bombay Marine at a salary of £2000 a year, but he had taken a liking to Australia and was a candidate for the governorship of Port Phillip, although the salary was not expected to be more than £800 a year. The more recently created City of Hobsons Bay is also named after William.

New Zealand 
On 26 May 1837 Hobson sailed to the Bay of Islands, New Zealand, in response to a request for help from James Busby, the British Resident, who felt threatened by wars between Māori tribes. For three months in 1837 Pōmare II (Whiria) fought with Tītore until a peace agreement was negotiated by Tareha. On his return to England in 1838, Hobson submitted a report on New Zealand, in which he proposed establishing British sovereignty over the islands in small pockets similar to the Hudson's Bay Company in Canada.

Lieutenant-Governor 

At the time, the British government recognised the sovereignty of the Māori people, as represented in the Declaration of the Independence of New Zealand of October 1835. Hobson was appointed lieutenant-governor under the Governor of New South Wales, Sir George Gipps—ratified on 30 July 1839—and British consul to New Zealand—confirmed on 13 August 1839.

On 14 August 1839, Constantine Henry Phipps, 1st Marquess of Normanby issued Hobson with detailed instructions, giving the British government's reasons for intervention in New Zealand and directions for the purchase of land "by fair and equal contracts". The land was later resold to Pākehā settlers at a profit to provide for further operations.

Hobson arrived in the Bay of Islands aboard  on 29 January 1840 with a small group of officials, including an executive council consisting of Colonial Secretary Willoughby Shortland, Colonial Treasurer George Cooper and Attorney-General Francis Fisher. The legislative council comprised the above officials and three Justices of the Peace. Hobson appointed as three Magistrates, Messrs. Shortland, Johnson, and Matthew.

Treaty of Waitangi 

The Treaty of Waitangi was first proposed by Hobson on his return to Britain from his first visit to New Zealand. Upon arrival in New Zealand, Hobson almost immediately drafted the Treaty of Waitangi together with his secretary James Freeman and James Busby. Busby had previously drafted the Declaration of the Independence of New Zealand.

Hobson headed the British signatories. Of the 40 or so Māori chiefs, the Ngapuhi chief Hōne Heke was the first to sign the treaty. As each chief signed, Hobson said "He iwi tahi tātou", meaning "We are [now] one people". To enhance the authority of the treaty eight further copies were made and sent around the country to gather additional signatures. After obtaining signatures to the Treaty at the Bay of Islands (6 February 1840), he travelled to Waitematā Harbour to obtain more signatures and to survey a suitable location for a new capital (he also sent the Deputy Surveyor-General, William Cornwallis Symonds, to other areas to obtain more signatures). After suffering a stroke on 1 March 1840, he was taken back to the Bay of Islands, where he recovered sufficiently to continue work.

On 21 May 1840, in response to the creation of a "republic" by the New Zealand Company settlers of Port Nicholson, who were laying out a new town under the flag of the United Tribes of New Zealand, Hobson asserted British sovereignty over the whole of New Zealand, despite the incompleteness of the treaty signing. He sent Willoughby Shortland and some soldiers to Port Nicholson on 25 May 1840, and the council of the settlers was disbanded. Their leader, William Wakefield, later travelled to the Bay of Islands to pledge allegiance to the Crown. His suggestion to make Port Nicholson the capital was rejected in favour of Hobson's plan for a new town on Waitematā Harbour, to be named Auckland after the Earl of Auckland.

On 11 July 1840, the French frigate L'Aube arrived at the Bay of Islands on its way to Banks Peninsula as part of the settlement plan of the Nanto-Bordelaise Company. Hobson immediately sent two magistrates to Akaroa to establish the British claim to sovereignty by holding courts. Near the end of 1840, the Port Nicholson settlers sent a petition to Queen Victoria calling for Hobson's dismissal over his treatment of them. Hobson responded on 26 May 1841 to the Foreign Secretary.

Governor 
In November 1840, the Queen signed a royal charter for New Zealand to become a Crown Colony separate from New South Wales. Hobson was sworn in by the Chief Justice as Governor of New Zealand on 3 May 1841. On the same day, the General Legislative Council came into being, with Hobson in charge of appointing its membership.

Hobson travelled to Wellington in August 1841, where he heard the complaints of settlers and selected magistrates. He then visited Akaroa to settle the French claims. Back in Auckland, he had some difficulty with the Māori, and his government was ridiculed by journalists in Wellington and Auckland. He responded by closing down the New Zealand Herald and Auckland Gazette. With his government low on funds, he resorted to issuing unauthorised bills on the British Treasury in 1842. Hobson faced opposition from the "Senate clique" radicals who sent a petition to the Foreign Secretary to have Hobson recalled. One of Hobson's last actions was to declare an Auckland Anniversary Day, to mark the anniversary of his arrival in the Bay of Islands.

Hobson suffered a second stroke and died on 10 September 1842, prior to being recalled from office. He was buried in the Symonds Street cemetery in Auckland. The West Auckland suburb of Hobsonville is named after him.

Notes

Further reading 
 Hobson, W. Papers, 1833–1846. MS Papers 46. WTU
 Lambourn, Alan (1988) The treatymakers of New Zealand: heralding the birth of a nation. (Lewes, Sussex: Book Guild). 
 
 
 Scholefield, G. H. Captain William Hobson. London, 1934
 UK Parliament. Correspondence and other papers relating to New Zealand, 1835–1845. In Irish University Press series of British parliamentary papers. Colonies: New Zealand. Vols 3 & 4. Shannon, 1970

External links 

 E. J. Tapp, 'Hobson, William (1793–1842)', Australian Dictionary of Biography

1792 births
1842 deaths
Burials at Symonds Street Cemetery
Explorers of Australia
Governors-General of New Zealand
Irish emigrants to New Zealand (before 1923)
People from Waterford (city)
Treaty of Waitangi
Signatories of the Treaty of Waitangi
Members of the New Zealand Legislative Council (1841–1853)
Royal Navy officers
Royal Navy personnel of the Napoleonic Wars